Heat of the Moment may refer to:

Passion (emotion)
"Heat of the Moment" (Asia song), 1982
"Heat of the Moment" (After 7 song), 1989

See also
"In the Heat of the Moment", 2014 song by Noel Gallagher's High Flying Birds